Leo Anthony O'Connell (August 31, 1883 – August 15, 1934) was an American amateur soccer player who competed in the 1904 Summer Olympics. In 1904 he was a member of the St. Rose Parish team, which won the bronze medal in the soccer tournament. He played in three of the four matches.

References

External links
Leo O'Connell's profile at Sports Reference.com

American soccer players
Footballers at the 1904 Summer Olympics
Olympic bronze medalists for the United States in soccer
1883 births
1934 deaths
Medalists at the 1904 Summer Olympics
Association football forwards